Myron Reed (born June 9, 1997) is an American professional wrestler. He is best known for his stint in Major League Wrestling where he is a three-time MLW World Middleweight Champion.

Professional wrestling career

Early career (2016-2018) 

Reed initially started his career in wrestling on YouTube, where he competed in backyard wrestling, going by the names "The Bad Reed" and "Tyler Reed". His first stint as a professional wrestler was at the Kentucky-based World Wrestling Alliance, where he went by the name “Brother Reed”.

Major League Wrestling (2018-2023) 
On the July 19, 2018 episode of Major League Wrestling’s Fusion, Reed made his debut for the company in a losing effort to Kotto Brazil.

In a storyline started on the February 16, 2019 edition of MLW Fusion a group known as Injustice was formed. Originally a pairing of Reed and Rich Swann, the stable later added Jordan Oliver, Kotto Brazil & Saieve Al Sabah. However the group would split with Myron Reed being the only one still with the company as of 2022.

On the November 11, 2019 episode of Major League Wrestling's flagship show MLW Fusion, Reed defeated Teddy Hart to win the World Middleweight Championship after Contra Unit member Josef Samael threw a fireball into Hart's face. Reed successfully defended his title on four different occasions against El Lindaman, Drago, Larado Kid and Brian Pillman Jr. at Fusion. On January 6, 2021, Lio Rush defeated Myron Reed to end his 424 days title reign at 
special episode of Fusion - Kings Of Colosseum 2021.

On the May 5, 2021 episode of Major League Wrestling’s Fusion, Myron Reed defeated Lio Rush to win the World Middleweight Championship, making Reed the first two-time champion in company's history. However, on October 2, 2021, at MLW Fightland, Reed's title reign come to end against Yoshihiro Tajiri in a four-way match which also includes Aramis and Arez.

On the January 21, 2022 MLW Tapings, Reed would make history yet again, by defeating Yoshihiro Tajiri, Matt Cross, and Bandido in a four-way match to become a record three time MLW World Middleweight Champion.

On January 14, 2023, following the expiration of his MLW contract, Reed announced that he is a free agent.

Championships and accomplishments
AAW Wrestling
 AAW Tag Team Championship (1 time) – with A. R. Fox
AAW Heritage Championship (1 time)
Desastre Total Ultraviolento
DTU Nexo Championship (1 time) - with Mickey Midas
Glory Pro Wrestling
Crown of Glory Championship (1 time)
United Glory Championship (1 time) - Stephen Wolf
Independent Wrestling Association Mid-South
IWA Mid-South Tag Team Championship (2 times) - with Sugar Dunkerton (1) and Trey Miguel (1)
Candido Cup (2017) - with Sugar Dunkerton
Independent Wrestling Expo
Flightweight Tournament (2021)
Major League Wrestling
MLW World Middleweight Championship (3 times)
New South Championship Wrestling
NWA Southern Tag Team Championship (1 time) - with Mickey Muscles
Paradigm Pro Wrestling
PPW Championship (1 time, current)
 Pro Wrestling Illustrated
Ranked No. 84 of the top 500 singles wrestlers in the PWI 500 in 2021
Rockstar Pro Wrestling
Rockstar Pro Trios Championship (3 times) - with Clayton Jackson & Zachary Wentz (1), Alex Colon & Trey Miguel and Dustin Rayz & Trey Miguel
Scenic City Invitational
Scenic City Trios Tournament (2017) - with Curt Stallion and Gary Jay
Squared Circle Project
Squared Circle Project Heavyweight Championship (1 time)
Wild Championship Wrestling Outlaws
Young Guns Tournament (2017)

References

External links 
Myron Reed profile at Major League Wrestling
 
 
 

1997 births
Living people
Sportspeople from Louisville, Kentucky
American male professional wrestlers
African-American male professional wrestlers
Professional wrestlers from Kentucky
21st-century African-American sportspeople
21st-century professional wrestlers
AAW Heritage Champions
AAW Tag Team Champions
MLW World Middleweight Champions